Agatha Raisin and the Quiche of Death is British comedy-drama television film based on the 1992 novel of the same name by M. C. Beaton. The film aired on Sky1 on 26 December 2014.  It served as a pilot to a full series entitled Agatha Raisin.

Plot
Agatha Raisin, a public relations professional, gives up her life in London in the hope of starting a new life in the seemingly quiet village of Carsley, but soon finds herself a suspect in a murder case when she enters the village's annual quiche-making competition in an attempt to ingratiate herself with the community. She sets out to clear her name and solve the mystery of the quiche of death.

Characters
Ashley Jensen stars as Agatha Raisin who has escaped to Carsley from London for a quieter life. Robert Bathurst joins the cast as Andy Cummings-Browne who has had his fair share of women from the village. Hermione Norris stars as his suffering wife Jo Cummings-Browne. Matt McCooey appears as a dedicated police officer DC Bill Wong.

Cast
 Ashley Jensen as Agatha Raisin
 Hermione Norris as Jo Cummings Brown
 Robert Bathurst as Andy Cummings Brown
 Katy Wix as Gemma Simpson
 Mathew Horne as Roy Silver
 Jamie Glover as James Lacey
Jason Barnett as DI Wilkes
 Matt McCooey as DC Bill Wong
 Caroline Langrishe as Sheila Barr
Kobna Holdbrook-Smith as Jez
 Lucy Liemann as Sarah
 Carli Norris as Ella Cartwright
John Lightbody as John Cartwright
Sandy McDade as Gail
Tim Stern as Gene
 Richard Durden as Mr Boggle
 Marcia Warren as Mrs Boggle
 Joseph Long as Spiros Eonomides
 Nichola McAuliffe as Maria Borrow
John Mason as Steve
 Gavin Lee Lewis as Ian - Boyhood Band
 Nik Davies as Limousine driver
 Daniel Lander as Tug-of-War man
 Colin Murtagh as Paparazzi
 Alexander Gatherer as Employee

Production
It was commissioned by Cameron Roach for Sky  which announced on 22 August 2014 that it had commissioned for Sky1. Sky1's chief, Adam MacDonald, said, "Agatha Raisin And The Quiche Of Death is a contemporary, sharp and witty crime drama offering for the upcoming festive season." Agatha Raisin and the Quiche of Death began filming in September 2014. On her role in the film, Ashley Jensen said, "I am absolutely delighted to be on board! It's not often a part like this comes along for a woman. Agatha Raisin is a strong forthright, independent, driven, successful woman, who is both funny and flawed, a real woman of our time."

References

External links
 Official website
 

2014 television films
2014 films
British television films
2014 television specials
English-language television shows
Films based on British novels
Films shot in England
Films set in England